is a Japanese fantasy and romantic comedy manga series written and illustrated by Kenta Shinohara. It has been serialized in Shueisha's Weekly Shōnen Jump since February 2021, with its chapters collected into nine tankōbon volumes as of January 2023. As of November 2022, the manga had over 1.1 million copies in circulation.

Synopsis
The series focuses on Nico Wakatsuki a teenage witch who, after completing her magical training, moves into a house with her childhood friend Morihito Otogi, a human-looking ogre. Due to their families' ancestral history, Morihito is to become Nico's familiar and protect her. Nico also hopes this will help them become a couple, as he is her longtime crush. As the story progresses, Nico and Morihito find themselves forced to deal with the various supernatural and legendary beings they encounter while also trying to solve all the unpredictable problems Nico's magic causes in their daily lives.

Characters

A teenage witch who is in love with her childhood friend Morihito. She is a very kind person who often tries to help people with magic, but usually does so without fully knowing the details or side effects of the spells.

An ogre with extreme physical strength due to practicing Ogre Qigong. He was childhood friends with Nico, who calls him , and is the only one who does not know she is in love with him. In contrast to the other major characters, Morihito is a serious and responsible person.

A tengu who can control wind and befriended Nico during her training. He is Nico's "crow familiar", and moves in with her and Morihito as he is also tasked with protecting her. Kanshi has good social skills and speaks in the Kansai dialect.

Keigo is usually a quiet person, but becomes arrogant when showing off his knowledge of obscure culture. Wolf, however, is always arrogant and rude. He is a classmate of Nico and Morihito, and eventually moves in with them.

A young vampire, who feeds by absorbing people's life force, from a family of futsumashi or exorcists. He is a third-year middle school student and usually carries a parasol to shield him from the sun. Although appearing polite and graceful, he has no filter and will say whatever is on his mind. He moves in with Nico and the others.

Production
Kenta Shinohara revealed that it takes five days to draw the characters in Witch Watch, while the storyboards take two and a half days. In January 2023, Shinohara stated on Twitter that Witch Watch would probably be his last weekly serial. He explained that he is "physically unable" to do one, even if he wanted to. The February 6, 2023 chapter of the manga began a crossover with Shinohara's previous Weekly Shōnen Jump series, Sket Dance.

Publication
Witch Watch is written and illustrated by Kenta Shinohara. The manga began its serialization in Shueisha's shōnen manga magazine Weekly Shōnen Jump on February 8, 2021. Shueisha has collected its chapters into individual tankōbon volumes. The first volume was released on June 4, 2021. As of January 4, 2023, nine volumes have been released.

Witch Watch has been licensed for simultaneous publication in North America as it is released in Japan, with its chapters being digitally launched by Viz Media on its Shonen Jump website. Shueisha also simulpublishes the series in English for free on the Manga Plus app and website. Viz Media will publish its volumes in digital format.

Volume list

Chapters not yet in tankōbon format
These chapters have yet to be published in a tankōbon volume.

Reception

Popularity and sales
In June 2021, Witch Watch was nominated for the seventh Next Manga Award in the Best Printed Manga category and placed 10th out of 50 nominees. It was also nominated for the same award and placed 2nd out of 50 nominees in 2022. By November 2022, the first eight volumes of the manga had over 1.1 million copies in circulation.

Critical response
Timothy Donohoo of Comic Book Resources compared Witch Watch to Kōji Miura's Blue Box and Shigure Tokita's Don't Blush, Sekime-san! due to both series having concepts and romantic aspects similar to Witch Watchs.

References

Further reading

External links
  
 
 

Fantasy anime and manga
Fiction about monsters
Romantic comedy anime and manga
Shōnen manga
Shueisha manga
Viz Media manga
Witchcraft in anime and manga
Witchcraft in written fiction